The 2021 Qatar motorcycle Grand Prix (officially known as the Barwa Grand Prix of Qatar) was the first round of the 2021 Grand Prix motorcycle racing season. It was held at the Losail International Circuit in Lusail on 28 March 2021.

Background

MotoGP Entrants
Stefan Bradl replaced Marc Márquez for the start of the season, as Márquez prolonged his recovery from his 2020 season-ending injury.

Free practice

MotoGP 
In the first session, Franco Morbidelli was the fastest ahead of Aleix Espargaró and Jack Miller.

Qualifying

MotoGP

Race

MotoGP

Moto2

 Simone Corsi suffered a fractured wrist in a crash during qualifying and withdrew from the event.
 Barry Baltus suffered a fractured wrist in a crash during practice and withdrew from the event.

Moto3

Championship standings after the race
Below are the standings for the top five riders, constructors, and teams after the round.

MotoGP

Riders' Championship standings

Constructors' Championship standings

Teams' Championship standings

Moto2

Riders' Championship standings

Constructors' Championship standings

Teams' Championship standings

Moto3

Riders' Championship standings

Constructors' Championship standings

Teams' Championship standings

Notes

References

External links

Qatar
Motorcycle Grand Prix
Qatar motorcycle Grand Prix
Motorcycle Grand Prix